The 1974 Western Championships, also known as the Cincinnati Open, was a men's tennis tournament played on indoor carpet courts at the Cincinnati Convention Center in Cincinnati, Ohio in the United States that was part of the 1974 Commercial Union Assurance Grand Prix. The tournament was held from July 31 until August 4, 1974. It was the only time in the history of the tournament to date that it was played indoor. For the first time since 1919 the tournament did not organize a women's competition. First-seeded Marty Riessen won the singles title and earned $8,000 first-prize money. It was his third singles title at the Cincinnati Open and his first at the Western Championships after five previous losses in the final.

Finals

Singles
 Marty Riessen defeated  Robert Lutz 7–6(8–6), 7–6(7–5)
 It was Riessen's only singles title of the year and the 7th of his career during the Open Era.

Doubles
 Dick Dell /  Sherwood Stewart defeated  Jim Delaney /  John Whitlinger 4–6, 7–6, 6–2

Notes

References

External links
 
 ITF tournament edition details
 ATP tournament profile

Cincinnati Open
Cincinnati Masters
Cincinnati Open
Cincinnati Open
Cincinnati Open
Cincinnati Open